Ethnic violence has been present in Afghanistan for hundreds of years. As a geographically fragmented state, Afghanistan is separated into as many as 14 ethnic groups that have historically faced divisions that devolved into violence. This conflict reached its culminating point in the 1990s with the rise of the Taliban and the genocide of a number of the country's ethnic groups.

Demographics 

There are 14 nationally recognized  ethnic groups in Afghanistan, including Tajiks, Pashtuns, Hazaras, Uzbeks and others who make up less than 2% each. The most recent figures on the ethnic affiliations come from a survey conducted by the Asia Foundation in 2014. According to the representative survey, 43% of the population identifies as Pashtun, 27% as Tajik, 15% as Hazara, 8% as Uzbek, 2% as Turkmen, 2% as Aimaq, 1% as Baloch, 1% as Nuristani, and 1% as Pashaye.

Geographic Separation 
Afghanistan's ethnic groups are, for the most part, separated into 4 distinct zones of the country. These zones are referred to as Herat, Kabul, Mazar-i-Sharif, and Kandahar. The country's mountainous terrain, rivers, and lack of infrastructure limit communication and travel between these zones which reinforces existing divides between major ethnic groups.

1880-1901 
Abdul Rahman Kahn was the Amir of Afghanistan between 1880 and 1901. During this time, the historic ethnic majority held by the Pashtuns fluctuated greatly. The number of Pashtuns decreased in 1893 after Rahman ceded Pashtun held areas to British India. However, the Pashtun population soon returned to higher numbers when the Emir resettled many of the group into the country's north. 

In the 1880s and 1890s, Abdul Rahman Khan fought for the removal of Hazaras from the country, even going so far as to order their murders. During this time, the Hazaras were set apart from Afghanistan's other ethnic groups due to their status as Shia rather than Sunni Muslims. As a Sunni Muslim and a member of the Pashtun majority, Abdul Rahman Kahn encouraged violence against the Hazaras. 

This genocide of the Hazaras was also perpetrated by Pashtun religious leaders. Members of the Pashtun group were told that they would likely be rewarded by Allah if they participated in this violence towards the Hazaras.

During this period of conflict, around 60% of Afghanistan's Hazaras were killed and even more were forced to migrate into surrounding countries.

1901-1978 
During this time, the Pashtuns sought the creation of an independent Pashtunistan that was separate from Afghanistan. This hypothetical state was intended to exist along the Durand Line, the border between Pakistan and Afghanistan, and to unite Pashtuns living in both states.  This issue and others saw political groups in Afghanistan increasingly forming along ethnic lines.  For example, Pashtun nationalists banded together to form Afghan Millat, a political party that fought for the creation of Pashtunistan.

In 1973, Muhammad Daoud came into power as the president of Afghanistan. Though he is considered to be an authoritarian leader, he declared Afghanistan to be a republic during his rule.

1978-1992 
1978 saw the spawning of the Saur Revolution.  This period of turmoil involved a coup backed by the People's Democratic Party of Afghanistan (PDPA) taking control of the government until 1992.  On April 27, 1978, perpetrators of the revolution assassinated Daud and took control of the government.  

The coup is believed to have been made up of Marxists/Leftists who resented the then government's treatment of their ideology. The tipping point for Afghanistan leftists was the assassination of Mir Akbar Khaibar on April 17, 1978. Mir Akbar Khaibar was a leader within the PDPA and the party's other leaders were arrested shortly after his murder.  

Scholars are divided over the possibility of Soviet involvement in the coup.

Taliban Rule (1992-2001) 

After the Pashtun Taliban rose to power in the mid-1990s, they began committing atrocities against their opponents, the Hazaras, Tajiks, and Uzbeks. In 1998, the United Nations accused the Taliban of denying emergency food by the UN's World Food Program to 160,000 hungry and starving people (most of whom were Hazaras and Tajiks) "for political and military reasons". The UN stated that the Taliban were starving people for their military agenda and using humanitarian assistance as a weapon of war. The colonization of Pashtuns and Pashtun nationalism was part of the ideology of the Taliban.

The Northern Alliance was formed in opposition to the Taliban and was composed of Hazaras, Tajiks, and Uzbeks. The group was supported by a number of countries, such as the United States, Iran, Russia, and India. In 1997, the Northern Alliance killed 2,000 members of the Taliban that they had captured in conflicts between the two groups. 
	 		 	
On August 8, 1998, the Taliban launched an attack on Mazar-i Sharif. Once in control, the Taliban began to kill people based on their ethnicity, especially Hazaras and Uzbeks. Men, women and children were hunted by Taliban forces as a result of the 1500-3000 Taliban fighters executed by the Uzbek Junbish-i Milli militia. This act of ethnic cleansing left an estimated 5,000 to 6,000 dead.

The War in Afghanistan 

In 2001, Human Rights Watch voiced the fear that ethnic violence in Afghanistan was likely to increase due to the escalation of conflict between factions. Thousands of Pashtun people became refugees as they fled Uzbek Junbish-i Milli troops, some of whom were reported as looting, raping and kidnapping. These crimes were said to have occurred when the troops were disarming Pashtuns accused of being former Taliban supporters in northern Afghanistan during the early stages of the War in Afghanistan (2001–2021) which removed the dominantly Pashtun Taliban from power.

Political measures 

In 2010 Afghan President Hamid Karzai set up a panel to investigate continuing ethnic violence as he believes it is hampering the military efforts to contain the Taliban insurgency.

See also 

 Crime in Afghanistan
 Pashtun colonization of northern Afghanistan
 Pashtunization

References

Further reading
 Human Rights Watch Backgrounder

Ethnic groups in Afghanistan
Afghanistan
Society of Afghanistan
Crime in Afghanistan